Massachusetts's fifteenth congressional district is an obsolete district. It was also for a short time in the early 19th century a Massachusetts District of Maine. It was eliminated in 1943 after the 1940 Census. Its last location was in eastern Massachusetts at Cape Cod.

Cities and towns in the district

1910s
"Bristol County: Cities of Fall River, Taunton, and Attleboro, and towns of Berkley, Dighton, Freetown, Mansfield, North Attleboro, Norton, Raynham, Rehoboth, Seekonk, Somerset, Swansea, and Westport. Plymouth County: Town of Lakeville."

List of members representing the district

References

 Congressional Biographical Directory of the United States 1774–present
 

15
Former congressional districts of the United States
1943 disestablishments in Massachusetts
Constituencies established in 1803
Constituencies disestablished in 1943
1803 establishments in Massachusetts